Stedham is a village and parish in the Chichester district of West Sussex, England, on the A272 road  west of Midhurst.
 
The village has a garden centre, social club and a pub, The Hamilton Arms, which has a Thai restaurant. The village shop closed in 1991.

Governance
It lies within the civil parish of Stedham with Iping where the 2011 Census population is included. An electoral ward in the same name exists. At the 2011 Census the ward had a population of 2,114.

Parish history

Church
The parish church of St James is at the north end of the village just above the River Rother. The original church was built c. 1040, however not much of this is left. The upper parts of the church are dated c. 1673. The churchyard contains a yew tree which is thought to be over 2,500 years old.

Domesday Book
The parish (then called Stedeham) was listed in the Domesday Book (1086), in the ancient hundred of Easebourne, as a large settlement having 49 households: 23 villagers, 16 smallholders and 10 slaves. Resources included ploughing land, meadows, woodland, three mills and the church.

19th century

Stedham's watermill at the north end of the village was used for manufacturing blotting paper.

Education
Stedham Primary School is the main primary school serving the village. In 2014 Durand Academy in Stockwell, South London opened a boarding school for its senior pupils at the site of the former St Cuthman's School in Stedham, The school admitted pupils from South London, however the school is now closed.

References

External links

Further historical information and sources on GENUKI

Villages in West Sussex